Al Souq (also spelled As Sawq) is a commercial district in Qatar, located in the municipality of Doha. It was named for its high density of souqs (markets) in the southern section of the district.

Abdullah bin Jassim Street services numerous government buildings and banks in the northern end of the district, including Abdulla Bin Zaid Al Mahmoud Islamic Cultural Center, Qatar Central Bank, the Ministry of Economy and Finance, and the Supreme Council for Economic Affairs and Investment. All of the district's souqs are located south of Abdullah bin Jassim Street. Its souqs include Souq Al Badi, Souq Al Faleh, Souq Al Asiery, Souq Al Dira, and Souq Al Jaber.

Doha's largest souq, Souq Waqif, is located to the immediate west of the district in Al Jasrah, which is separated from Al Souq by Grand Hamad Street.

Geography

Al Souq borders the following districts:
Al Mirqab to the east, separated by Jabr Bin Mohammed Street.
Al Jasrah to the west, separated by Grand Hamad Street.
Old Al Ghanim to the south, separated by Ali Bin Abdullah Street.

Transport
Major roads that run through the district are Grand Hamad Street, Abdullah Bin Jassim Street, Ali Bin Abdullah Street, and Corniche Street.

Demographics
As of the 2010 census, the district comprised 83 housing units and 699 establishments. There were 679 people living in the district, of which 97% were male and 3% were female. Out of the 679 inhabitants, 97% were 20 years of age or older and 3% were under the age of 20. The literacy rate stood at 97.8%.

Employed persons made up 97% of the population. Females accounted for 0% of the working population, while males accounted for 100% of the working population.

References

Communities in Doha
Doha
Souqs